Jorge Alvarez may refer to:

Jorge Álvarez (rower) (born 1959), Cuban Olympic rower
Jorge Álvarez (sport shooter)
Jorge Montt (1845–1922), vice-admiral of the Chilean navy and president of Chile from 1891 to 1896
Jorge Álvares (died 1521), Portuguese explorer
Jorge Álvarez (producer), Argentine music producer
Jorge Eduardo Álvarez (born 1990), Chilean footballer
 Jorge Álvarez (Honduran footballer)